Vincent Joseph "Boomer" Scott (July 10, 1925 – July 13, 1992) was a Canadian football player.  He played for the Hamilton Tiger-Cats, and was later a Hamilton city councillor. He became a Canadian citizen in the mid-1950s

Scott was born in Le Roy, New York.  He suffered from polio as a child and was left with a slightly shrunken left leg, although this did not inhibit his sports career.  He made the University of Notre Dame team as a lineman, and played for two seasons with the Buffalo Bills of the AAFC before joining the Hamilton Wildcats franchise in 1949.  The Wildcats merged with the Hamilton Tigers in 1950 to create the Hamilton Tiger-Cats, and Scott played for the merged team until his retirement in 1962.  He made six Grey Cup appearances, and helped the Tiger-Cats win the cup in 1953 and 1957.

He worked at Stelco after his retirement, and later entered the real estate business.  He hosted a talk show in the 1970s and 1980s, and was named to the Canadian Football Hall of Fame in 1982.  He was elected to Hamilton City Council for the city's fourth ward in the 1982 municipal election, and subsequently participated in discussions with Tiger-Cats owner Harold Ballard to ensure that the team remained in Hamilton.  Fellow councillor Mike Davison described him as a conservative.

Scott was defeated in his bid for re-election in 1985.  He suffered a stroke the following year, and never fully recovered.  He died in 1992 following a lengthy illness.

In 2007, he was inducted into the New York State Public High School Athletic Association Section V Football Hall of Fame.

References 

Some information is taken from Rian Melzer, "Star full of heart", Hamilton Spectator, 14 July 1992, C1, an obituary piece.

1925 births
1992 deaths
American football defensive linemen
American football offensive linemen
American players of Canadian football
Buffalo Bills (AAFC) players
Canadian football defensive linemen
Canadian Football Hall of Fame inductees
Canadian football offensive linemen
Hamilton, Ontario city councillors
Hamilton Tiger-Cats players
Hamilton Wildcats football players
Notre Dame Fighting Irish football players
People from Le Roy, New York
Players of American football from New York (state)